Beginning during Operation Desert Shield in August 1990, while preparing for the Gulf War, the United States sent a large troop contingent to Saudi Arabia. After the war, remnant troops, primarily U.S. Air Force personnel, augmented by a smaller number of coordinating and training personnel from the U.S. Navy, U.S. Army and U.S. Marine Corps remained in Saudi Arabia under the aegis of Joint Task Force Southwest Asia (JTF-SWA), as part of Operation Southern Watch (OSW).  The United Kingdom and France also maintained a small contingent of Royal Air Force and French Air Force training personnel.

Operation Southern Watch patrolled by the U.S. Fifth Fleet, based in Bahrain enforced the Iraqi no-fly zones over southern Iraq set up after 1991, and the country's oil exports through the shipping lanes of the Persian Gulf.

In 2003, the United States withdrew remaining non-training troops or armament purchase support from Saudi Arabia, with 200 of these support personnel remaining, primarily at Eskan Village, a base which is owned by the Saudi Arabian government itself, in support of the US Military Training Mission (USMTM) in Saudi Arabia and the Office of the Program Manager, Saudi Arabian National Guard Modernization Program.

Overview
Since Saudi Arabia houses the holiest sites in Islam (Mecca and Medina), a number of Muslims, including Bin Laden and his supporters, were outraged at the permanent presence of non-Muslim military personnel. The continued presence of U.S. troops after the Gulf War in Saudi Arabia was also one of the stated motivations behind the September 11th terrorist attacks and the Khobar Towers bombing.  The date of the 1998 United States embassy bombings was eight years to the day (August 7) that American troops were sent to Saudi Arabia.  

Opinion polls conducted by Gallup from 2006–2008, found that many in Muslim majority countries strongly objected to U.S. military bases in Saudi Arabia.  52% of Saudis agreed that removing military bases from Saudi Arabia would very significantly improve their opinion of the United States.  Also, 60% of Egyptians, 39% of Jordanians, 40% of Syrians and Palestinians, 55% of Tunisians, 13% of Iranians, 29% of Turks, 40% of Lebanese, and 30% of Algerians gave that opinion, too.

The U.S. had rejected the characterization of its presence as an "occupation", noting that the government of Saudi Arabia consented to the presence of troops.

Withdrawal
On April 29, 2003, Donald Rumsfeld announced that he would be withdrawing remaining U.S. troops from the country. Deputy Secretary of Defense Paul Wolfowitz had earlier said that the continuing large U.S. presence in the kingdom was putting American lives in danger. The announcement came one day after the Combined Air Operations Center (CAOC) was shifted from Prince Sultan Air Base to Al Udeid Air Base in Qatar.

Non-combat Defense assistance activities include United States Military Training Mission (USMTM) staff and the Office of the Program Manager, Saudi Arabian National Guard Modernization Program (OPM-SANG) at the Eskan Village, a Saudi owned complex outside of Riyadh.

U.S. officials transferred control of Prince Sultan Air Base to Saudi officials at a ceremony on August 26, 2003. The base had been home to up to 60,000 US personnel at one time.

Current U.S. units
 United States Military Training Mission Saudi Arabia (USMTM)
 Office of the Program Manager, Saudi Arabian National Guard Modernization Program (OPM-SANG)

See also
 Saudi Arabia–United States relations

References

Non-combat military operations involving the United States
Saudi Arabia–United States relations
Military withdrawals
Osama bin Laden